St. Martin's Cathedral may refer to
 St Martin's Cathedral, Bratislava, Slovakia
 St Martin's Cathedral (Spišská Kapitula), Slovakia
 Lucca Cathedral in Lucca, La cattedrale di San Martino
 Mainz Cathedral in Mainz 
 St. Martin's Cathedral, Utrecht
 St Martin's Cathedral, Ypres, technically no longer a cathedral
 St. Martin's Cathedral (Gander), Newfoundland

See also 
 St. Martin and St. Nicholas Cathedral, Bydgoszcz, Poland
 St. Martin's Church (disambiguation)